Focus on the Family Canada (French: Focus Famille), legally incorporated as the Focus on the Family (Canada) Association, is a Canadian affiliate of the American evangelical Christian organization Focus on the Family.  It was founded in 1983, and is based in Langley, British Columbia.

The group's stated aim is to "encourage and strengthen the Canadian family through education and resources based on Christian principles".

Ties to Focus on the Family USA
Focus on the Family Canada is operated and directed independently of Focus on the Family USA.  However, some ties do exist between the two organizations. Between 2000 and 2003, the Canadian affiliate received $1.6 million in services from the larger American organization. Jim Daly, President and CEO of Focus on the Family in the United States serves on the board of directors of Focus on the Family Canada. Other than receiving financial support from Focus on the Family USA between 2000 and 2003, Focus on the Family Canada relies fully on donor support for its operations.

Operations in Canada
The organization has funded its media broadcasts to help "preserve traditional values and the institution of the family."  It is opposed to same-sex marriage, LGBT adoption (and LGBT rights in general), abortion, pornography and premarital sex. Focus on the Family promotes child discipline and supports the continued legality of spanking as a form of discipline for children.

Focus on the Family Canada has also established the Institute of Marriage and Family Canada/Institut du Mariage et de la Famille Canada (IMFC). The IMFC is located in Ottawa, Ontario, near Parliament Hill, where the staff conduct and compile social policy research from Canada and around the world. The IMFC's mission is "to positively influence public opinion and promote public policy that values human life, the pre-eminence of marriage and the institution of the family." Its involvement in social issues is not limited to activism, as it has intervened in court cases such as one case in 1999 where it supported denying same-sex couples the right to apply for alimony from one another. The organization had intervenor status in the precedent setting case of Canadian Foundation for Children, Youth and the Law v. Canada (Attorney General), in which the Supreme Court of Canada upheld the legality of child spanking in Canada.

In addition, the organization publishes Today's Family News, a monthly e-newsletter that provides family-related news stories, research and analysis making headlines across Canada.

Organization
Current president is Jean-Paul Beran (2021-present). Former presidents of the organization include: Geoff Still (1986-1995), Bruce Gordon (1995–1998), one time Deputy Chief of Staff to PM Harper, Darrel Reid (1998–2004), Terence Rolston (2004–2021).

A former member of the board of directors of Focus on the Family Canada is Sharon Hayes, who from 1993 to 1997 was a Member of Parliament belonging to the Reform Party of Canada.

References

External links
 

1974 establishments in Canada
Evangelical parachurch organizations
Religious organizations based in Canada
Anti-abortion organizations in Canada
Charities based in Canada
Conservatism in Canada
Focus on the Family
Christian organizations established in 1983
Non-profit organizations based in Vancouver